KCHT (99.7 FM) is a sports formatted broadcast radio station.  The station is licensed to Childress, Texas and serves Childress and Childress County in Texas.  KCHT is owned by Paradise Broadcasting and operated by James G. Boles, Jr., their licensee.

References

External links
ESPN 99.7 Childress Online

2012 establishments in Texas
Sports radio stations in the United States
ESPN Radio stations
Radio stations established in 2012
CHT